Erik Andersson may refer to:

Sportsmen
Erik Andersson (athlete) (1921–2002), Swedish Olympic athlete
Erik Andersson (ice hockey, born 1971), Swedish ice hockey player who played for Calgary Flames
Erik Andersson (ice hockey, born 1982), Swedish ice hockey player playing for Skellefteå AIK
Erik Andersson (ice hockey, born 1986), Swedish ice hockey player playing for Timrå IK
Erik Andersson (ice hockey, born 1994), Swedish ice hockey player playing for HV71
Erik Andersson (speedway rider) (born 1984), Swedish speedway rider, competitor in 2007 Speedway Grand Prix of Sweden, etc.
Erik Andersson (swimmer, born 1984), Swedish swimmer
Erik Andersson (water polo) (1896–1985), Swedish water polo player and swimmer
Erik Andersson (footballer) (born 1997), Swedish footballer

Others
Erik Andersson (architect) (born 1971), Swedish architect who designed Sicklauddsbron
Erik Andersson (drummer), drummer for Swedish progressive death metal band Godgory

See also
Erik Andersen (disambiguation)
Eric Anderson (disambiguation)
Kent-Erik Andersson (born 1951), retired Swedish hockey right winger